The 2003 Penrith Panthers season is the 37th season in the club's history. Coached by John Lang and captained by Craig Gower, the Panthers competed in the National Rugby League's 2003 Telstra Premiership. The Panthers won the clubs second ever premiership after defeating the Sydney Roosters 18 – 6 in the grand final

Squad

Player transfers

Fixtures

Regular season

Ladder

Representative honours

References 

Penrith Panthers seasons
Penrith Panthers season